Joe Childress (October 26, 1933 – May 5, 1986) was a running back in the National Football League. He played college football for the Auburn Tigers.

College years
Childress was a two-time All-American at Auburn and was considered the finest fullback in the country during his junior and senior seasons. He led the Southeastern Conference in rushing and scoring his junior season in 1954 and was named the Gator Bowl MVP. Childress led Auburn with 1,677 yards rushing his senior season in 1955.

Pro career
Childress was selected in the first round of the 1956 NFL Draft by the Chicago Cardinals. For his entire career, he played for the Chicago Cardinals and St. Louis Cardinals, primarily as a backup running back. He was known as an excellent receiver out of the backfield and a punishing blocker. His best season came in 1963 when he led the Cardinals in rushing and gained over 1000 yards from scrimmage while filling in for the injured John David Crow. His best rushing game came on September 22, 1963 when he gained 136 yards on 22 carries against the Philadelphia Eagles. Later in the season against the Eagles, he caught a 78-yard touchdown pass from Charley Johnson.

Retirement
Childress retired as a player from the NFL in 1966. He coached five seasons with the Houston Oilers and later went into the securities business. In his 40s, he contracted a type of cancer and began the battle which ultimately he lost in 1986 at the age of 52.

References

1933 births
1986 deaths
Auburn Tigers football players
Players of American football from Alabama
Chicago Cardinals players
St. Louis Cardinals (football) players
Deaths from cancer in Texas
People from Robertsdale, Alabama